Pekin may refer to:

Places
A historic spelling of a name of Beijing, China
Pekin (hotel), a four star hotel in Moscow, Russia

United States
Pekin, Illinois
Pekin Township, Tazewell County, Illinois
Pekin, Indiana
Old Pekin, Indiana
New Pekin, Indiana
Pekin, Iowa
Paducah, Kentucky, originally settled as Pekin
Pekin, Maryland
Pekin Township, Michigan
Pekin, New York, hamlet in town of Cambria, New York
Pekin, North Dakota
Pekin, Carroll County, Ohio
Pekin, Warren County, Ohio

Animals
Red-billed leiothrix, or Pekin robin
American Pekin, an American breed of duck
German Pekin, a European breed of duck
Pekin (chicken), a breed of chicken

People
Tim Pekin (born 1965), former Australian rules footballer
Vladimir Pekin (born 1986), Bulgarian footballer

Other uses
 HMS Mohawk, a 1856 British gunvessel renamed Pekin in 1863
Salix babylonica, or Pekin willow

See also

 Pekin duck (disambiguation)
 Peking (disambiguation)
 Pekingese
 Peqin, a town in Albania
 Beijing (disambiguation)
 Beijingese (disambiguation)